Irving Stanley Smith  (21 May 1917 – 16 February 2000) was a New Zealand flying ace of the Royal New Zealand Air Force (RNZAF) during the Second World War, who subsequently transferred to the Royal Air Force (RAF). He was credited with the destruction of eight enemy aircraft.

Born in Invercargill, New Zealand, Smith joined the RNZAF in 1939 but was sent in England for training with the RAF. He flew Hawker Hurricanes with No. 151 Squadron during the Battle of Britain. The squadron switched to night fighting duties during the Blitz and by 1942 he was its commander. He spent most of 1943 on staff duties but returned to operations in February 1944 as commander of No. 487 (NZ) Squadron. He led it for the most of 1944, including during Operation Jericho and in air support duties for the D-Day landings in Normandy. The final months of the war was spent on instructing duties. Having formally transferred to the RAF from the RNZAF, he held a series of flying and administrative posts in the postwar period until his retirement in 1966. He later farmed in Devon and died in 2000, at the age of 82.

Early life
Born in Invercargill, New Zealand, on 21 May 1917, Irving Stanley Smith was the son of A. E. Smith and his wife. The family later moved north to Whangārei, where he was educated at Whau Valley School and then went on to Whangarei Boys' High School. He was working as an apprentice coachwork painter in Auckland when he was accepted for a short service commission in the Royal New Zealand Air Force in January 1939. He commenced training at Māngere in May, but soon went to England for flight training with the Royal Air Force (RAF).

Second World War
In September 1939, and with the Second World War now underway, Smith was at No. 10 Elementary Flying Training School at Yatesbury, learning to fly on Tiger Moths, before going on to No. 2 Flying Training School at Brize Norton in March the following year. In July 1940, with his flight training completed, he was posted to the RAF's No. 151 Squadron. His new unit was based at North Weald and flew the Hawker Hurricane.

Battle of Britain

During the Battle of Britain, No. 151 Squadron often operated over the Thames Estuary, intercepting incoming bombing raids mounted by the Luftwaffe. On 15 August Smith destroyed two Messerschmitt Bf 109 fighters in separate patrols. A further Bf 109 was damaged on one of the two patrols. He destroyed a Heinkel He 111 medium bomber on 24 August. A week later during a dogfight, he and his wingman forced the pilot of a Bf 109 into a mistake that saw the German aircraft crash into the ground. At this stage, the squadron had been operating from Stapleford for a week and from here on 31 August Smith flew four sorties; on the first of these he destroyed a Dornier Do 17 medium bomber and on another damaged a second Do 17. He and the rest of the squadron were withdrawn to Digby for a rest the next day.

Many experienced pilots had been lost in the previous weeks and these were replaced with volunteers from Fairey Battle squadrons, with Smith and his fellow veterans helping bring them up to operational status. No. 151 Squadron soon returned to operations, initially carrying out convoy patrols. On 2 October, Smith, while flying a training sortie with his section, intercepted a He 111 that had just bombed the Rolls-Royce factory at Derby. Although the bomber was flying in cloud, he had detected the disturbance in the cloud formation caused by its tail fin. Using this as a guide, he went into the cloud and, flying on instruments, opened fire upon feeling the turbulence of the He 111. He then dropped out of the cloud and saw the bomber descending as well, with a damaged engine. He attacked again and his efforts saw the He 111 crashing into shallow waters off Chapel St Leonards. The crew all swam to shore.

The Blitz
By November, the Luftwaffe had significantly increased its nighttime bombing raids and in response, a number of squadrons, including No. 151 Squadron, switched to a night-fighting role. It converted to the Boulton Paul Defiant but in addition to its two flights of this type retained one, commanded by Smith, of Hurricanes. From December, and operating from Wittering, the squadron was tasked with protecting the Midlands region. During this time, on 7 March 1941, Smith was awarded the Distinguished Flying Cross (DFC). By this time he was nicknamed 'Black', to distinguish him from another pilot with the same name; that pilot was nicknamed 'White'.

During the heaviest raid of The Blitz, which targeted London on 10 May, Smith shot down a He 111, his first success at night. By the middle of the year had been promoted to acting flight lieutenant and commanded a combined flight of Defiants and Hurricanes. The squadron was now co-operating with No. 1453 Flight which flew Turbinlite-equipped Douglas A-20 Havoc aircraft. The use of the Turbinlite in an airborne role was only of limited success and was later abandoned.

On 19 February 1942, Smith was promoted to acting squadron leader and took command of No. 151 Squadron. The same day, while flying a Defiant, he led the squadron in a patrol, providing cover for a convoy making its way along the Norfolk coast. Sighting German bombers attacking the convoy, he maneuvered his Defiant into a position where his gunner shot down a Do 17 and damaged a Junkers Ju 88 medium bomber. In April, the squadron stood down from operations for a time while converting to the de Havilland Mosquito but was back in action again by the end of the following month. By this time Smith had been promoted, to acting wing commander. He destroyed a He 111 and Do 217 on 24 June, and another He 111 was probably destroyed the same night. In mid-July, he was awarded a bar to his DFC. The citation for the bar read:

Command of No. 487 (NZ) Squadron
 
Placed on staff duties at the headquarters of Fighter Command in March 1943, Smith soon requested a return to operations. He was given command of the Mosquito-equipped No. 488 (NZ) Squadron in September but this was rescinded when Group Captain Basil Embry, who thought highly of Smith, requested his services for a training role at No. 2 Group. He eventually returned to operations as commander of No. 487 (NZ) Squadron in February 1944. His new charge was part of No. 2 Group, and was one of the squadrons of No. 140 Mosquito Wing at Hunsdon. At the time, it was switching from daylight operations to a nighttime intruder role and many of its subsequent missions involved attacking enemy airfields in occupied France and Holland.

Shortly after Smith's arrival, No. 140 Wing was tasked with executing Operation Jericho; this was a low-level raid on the prison at Amiens, the objective being to destroy the walls so that more than 100 members of the French Resistance, held as prisoners with many sentenced to death, could effect an escape. The raid was carried out on 18 February, and involved all three Mosquito squadrons of the wing; along with No. 487 Squadron, these were Nos. 21 and 464 Squadrons. Smith led seven Mosquitos of his squadron, which was the first to attack the prison; they successfully breached the east and north walls with bombs. The following No. 464 Squadron breached the prison buildings, allowing the French inside to escape. No. 21 Squadron was not required to drop its bombs. As the Mosquitos departed, they were intercepted by Focke Wulf Fw 190s. All those of No. 487 Squadron managed to return safely, although not without some being damaged, but some of the other aircraft participating  in the raid were shot down. One was that of Group Captain Percy Pickard, the station commander at Hunsdon. Over half of the captive resistance fighters were able to gain their freedom along with many of the other prisoners.

Due to the loss of Pickard, Smith became acting station commander at Hunsdon and also briefly commanded No. 140 Wing. In May, Smith, having relinquished his acting commands, and his squadron were transferred from No. 2 Group to the 2nd Tactical Air Force and commenced operations in support of the forthcoming invasion of Normandy. At night it continued to target the Luftwaffe airfields in France, Belgium and Holland, and in the six weeks prior to D-Day, it mounted 30 such missions, without losing any aircraft. During daylight hours it attacked the launching sites for flying bombs and transport infrastructure. On the night of 5 June, just prior to D-Day, several raids were mounted on targets in Caen and Saint-Lô and in the days afterwards it sought to destroy German forces moving to the Allied beachhead established at Normandy. By the end of August, at which time Smith relinquished command of the squadron, it had flown over 900 missions.

Later war service
After leaving No. 487 Squadron, Smith was placed on instructing duties and sent to No. 13 Operational Training Unit which provided crews trained on Mosquitos for No. 2 Group. He remained in this role until the conclusion of the war, ending the conflict credited with the destruction of eight enemy aircraft, one probably destroyed and four damaged. Once the war in Europe had concluded, he transferred to the RAF, having been granted a permanent commission with the rank of squadron leader. At the end of the year he was mentioned in despatches in the New Year Honours.

Postwar service
Early in 1946 Smith attended the RAF Staff College in Haifa and later in the year was assigned to a staff role at Air Headquarters in Malta. He was back in the United Kingdom for staff training in 1948, attending the Army Staff College at Camberley. At the start of 1950, he was appointed commander of No. 56 Squadron, which operated the Gloster Meteor from Waterbeach. By the middle of the year he had taken a wing commander (flying) role at Tangmere and a few months later assumed a similar appointment at Wattisham. He was appointed station commander at Church Fenton in January 1952 and in that year's Queen's Birthday Honours was appointed an Officer of the Order of the British Empire.

Smith served as a staff officer at Fighter Command headquarters from June 1953 until the start of 1956, at which time he was posted to the United States of America on an exchange program with the United States Air Force. He attended the Armed Forces Staff College at Norfolk and then served at Tactical Air Command at Langley Air Force Base. Returning to the United Kingdom in 1958, he was promoted to group captain that August and took command of the RAF's station at Jever, in Germany. In the Queen's Birthday Honours of 1961, Smith was appointed a Commander of the Order of the British Empire. Shortly afterwards he was assigned to the headquarters of Signals Command in a staff role. In 1964 he was sent to attend the National Defence College at Kingston, Ontario, in Canada.

Later life
Retiring from the RAF on medical grounds in February 1966, Smith settled in Devon where he took up farming. He died on 16 February 2000. He was predeceased by his wife, Joan , a former officer in the Women's Auxiliary Air Force who he had married in London in November 1942, and one of his two daughters. His son, Rupert Smith, was a general in the British Army who served as deputy supreme commander of Allied Forces Europe at NATO headquarters.

Notes

Footnotes

Citations

References

External links
 An Imperial War Museum oral history of Irving Smith recounting his wartime service

1917 births
2000 deaths
People from Invercargill
New Zealand World War II flying aces
New Zealand World War II pilots
Royal Air Force officers
Royal Air Force pilots of World War II
Recipients of the Distinguished Flying Cross (United Kingdom)
Commanders of the Order of the British Empire
The Few
Wing leaders